Dolichoderus inermis is a species of ant in the genus Dolichoderus. Described by Mackay in 1993, the species is endemic to Costa Rica.

References

Dolichoderus
Hymenoptera of North America
Insects described in 1993
Endemic fauna of Costa Rica